The Franklin River is a major perennial river located in the Central Highlands and western regions of Tasmania, Australia. The river is located in the Franklin-Gordon Wild Rivers National Park at the mid northern area of the Tasmanian Wilderness World Heritage Area. Its source is situated at the western edge of the Central Highlands and it flows west towards the West Coast.

The river is named in honour of Sir John Franklin, a Governor of Tasmania, who later died searching for the Northwest Passage.

Location and features
The river rises below Mount Hugel west of Derwent Bridge on the western slopes of the Central Highlands and flows generally west and south through remote and rugged mountainous country until meeting its confluence with the Gordon River. From source to mouth the river is joined by sixteen tributaries including the Surprise, Collingwood, Lucan, Loddon, Andrew and the Jane rivers. In its upper reaches, the Franklin is impounded by two reservoirs, Lake Undine and Lake Dixon. The river is crossed by the  Lyell Highway, also in its upper reaches. There are some archaeological sites that have identified pre-European activity. The upper reaches of the Franklin River were traversed by explorers in the nineteenth century, in their attempts to access Frenchmans Cap.

In the early twentieth century, access to the river was mostly pine logging in the lower reaches.

In the middle of the century, adventurous canoers sought to conquer the river's formidable challenges. The book Shooting The Franklin : Early canoeing on Tasmania's wild rivers identifies three trips in the 1950s.

Named places on the Franklin 

In the case of earlier travellers, few locations of the river were named at all. During his initial journeys down the river, Bob Brown submitted names for some features.  Before and since, rafters and canoers have added names for many of the bends and rapids on the river:

Franklin River conservation battle 

In the 1980s, the Franklin River become synonymous with Australia's largest conservation movement of the time, the movement battled to block Hydro Tasmania's proposed hydro-electric power plan, from building on the Franklin.

The focus on the dam and the issues of wilderness experience led to the development of people utilising the river at levels never previously experienced. The result of a drowning on the river led to stricter guidelines for users of the river. Richard Flanagan's Death of a River Guide is a fictional account of a drowning, by a writer with an academic and historical understanding of the area.

See also

 Commonwealth v Tasmania

References

Further reading

Gee, H and Fenton, J. (Eds) (1978)  The South West Book - A Tasmanian Wilderness Melbourne, Australian Conservation Foundation. 
Griffiths, Peter, and Baxter, Bruce (1997) The ever varying flood : a guide to the Franklin River  Richmond, Vic.Prowling Tiger Press 
 Lines, William J. (2006) Patriots : defending Australia's natural heritage  St. Lucia, Qld. : University of Queensland Press, 2006.

External links
 https://web.archive.org/web/20060821115426/http://www.parks.tas.gov.au/wha/wherein/detail.html location within the World Heritage Area

Lists of coordinates
Franklin-Gordon Wild Rivers National Park
Franklin River, Tasmania